Alejandro Alcondez (born August 3, 1970) is a Mexican/American actor, screenwriter, film producer and film director.  Born in Jalisco, Mexico, Alcondez moved to Hollywood, California in the early 1990s.  His acting career began in theater production plays, he then moved on to produce and write his own Mexican films Impacto de Muerte, Furia Salvaje and El Bronko Negro, which were distributed by his company Producciones Alejandro Alcondez.

His most recent American film "Cielito Lindo" Beautiful Heaven (produced, written and directed by Alejandro Alcondez) was written especially for Alcondez where he plays the lead role of Pablo Pastor. This film was released by his own production and distribution company Alejandro Alcondez Pictures

Biography

Career in Mexico

Alejandro Alcondez founded Producciones Alejandro Alcondez and decided to produce his first film.  Alejandro called upon Mexican actor Mario Almada (actor) he produced the film he also wrote the story and had a lead part alongside Mario Almada.  The film was directed by Alberto Mariscal.

Alcondez continued to film as a producer, writer, director and lead actor in a large number of films alongside Mexican actors Luis Aguilar, Sergio Goyri, Jorge Reynoso, Hugo Stiglitz, Fernando Almada, Fernando Saenz, Manuel Ojeda, Luis de Alba, Cesar Bono, Jaime Fernández, Miguel Angel Rodriguez, Bernabe Melendrez, Los Tucanes de Tijuana, Patricia Rivera, Roxana San Juan, Karla Barahona, Rebeca Silva, Lorena Velasquez, Lina Santos, and Rosenda Bernal, just to name a few. Alcondez has also starred in many film productions produced by Mr. Delfino Lopez of Baja Films.

Career in Hollywood

Alejandro Alcondez decided that he was ready for Hollywood and founded his American production company, Alejandro Alcondez Pictures, which produces English and Spanish movies for worldwide distribution. He produced his first English-speaking film entitled Cielito Lindo (Beautiful Heaven) in 2007. Alcondez visited many locations and decided to begin film production in Chihuahua, Chihuahua, Mexico.  The film premiered at Grauman's Chinese Theatre on May 27, 2010 Alejandro Alcondez not only wrote the script, produced the film, he also directed and starred as a lead actor alongside Adam Rodríguez, Nestor Serrano, Nicole Paggi, Ilia Volok, and Pato Hoffmann, among others.

Filmography

Acting career

As producer

As writer

As director

Theater
During his early career, Alcondez participated in various theater productions as an actor, director, writer and producer, gaining valuable experience in screenwriting and filmmaking

Other works
Alcondez has been part of many other projects including screen writing, producing and directing many music videos and various feature films like.  Cielito Lindo (Beautiful Heaven) filmed at Chihuahua, Mexico. In an interview in a Mexican newspaper, Alcondez explained the reason he chose to film at that location as well the plot of the film and when he wrote the Screenplay for "Cielito Lindo" (Beautiful Heaven). as well as the number of films he has participated.

References

External links
Alejandro Alcondez Website
Alejandro Alcondez Film Production Company (English)

Alejandro Alcondez Feature Films at YouTube
Alejandro Alcondez Google Profile
Alejandro Alcondez Film Premiere at Grauman's Chinese Theatre 

1970 births
Living people
20th-century American male actors
21st-century American male actors
American male film actors
Mexican male film actors
American film directors
Mexican film directors
American film producers
Mexican film producers
American male screenwriters
Mexican male screenwriters
Mexican emigrants to the United States
Mexican expatriate actors in the United States